The 1999 NCAA Division I-A football season saw Florida State named national champions, defeating Virginia Tech in the BCS Sugar Bowl.

Florida State became the first team in history to start out preseason No. 1 and remain there through the entire season. Their 12–0 season gave them 109 victories in the '90s, the most for any decade. Virginia Tech also had a remarkable season behind freshman quarterback Michael Vick, who was being touted as college football's best player.

Vick was outshone in the national championship game by Florida State wide receiver Peter Warrick. Warrick had early problems with the law, charged with a misdemeanor he sat out two games early in the season. But he scored three touchdowns in the title game, earning MVP honors.

The BCS adopted a new rule after the previous season, nicknamed the "Kansas State Rule," which stated that any team ranked in the top four in the final BCS poll is assured of an invitation to a BCS bowl game.

Many teams faced debacles. East Carolina faced Hurricane Floyd, and in that same week, faced the No. 9 Miami Hurricanes. The Pirates were down, 23–3, but scored 24 unanswered points to win the football game, 27–23.

Kansas State finished 6th in the BCS standings but again received no BCS bowl invitation, this time being passed over in favor of Michigan (ranked eighth). Kansas State's predicament demonstrated early on the problem of trying to balance historic bowl ties and creating a system which gives top bowl bids to the most deserving teams. In addition, for a second straight season, a team from outside the BCS Automatic Qualifying conferences (Marshall) went undefeated but did not receive a bid to a BCS bowl game, which illustrated the problem of BCS Non-Automatic Qualifying conference teams being shut out of the BCS bowls.

Rule changes
The NCAA Rules Committee adopted the following changes for the 1999 season:
 Holding penalties committed behind the line of scrimmage will be enforced from the previous spot, modifying a 1991 rule that penalized holding (as well as illegal use of hands and clipping) committed behind the scrimmage line from the spot of the foul.
 The penalty for intentional grounding was changed from a five-yard penalty from the spot of the foul plus loss-of-down to simply a loss-of-down at the spot of the foul.
 Bandannas that are visible are considered illegal equipment.
 Offensive teams may not break a huddle with 12 or more players.
 Continuing action dead-ball fouls against both teams are disregarded, however any disqualified players must leave the game.

Conference and program changes
Two teams upgraded from Division I-AA, thus increasing the number of Division I-A schools from 112 to 114.

The Mountain West Conference was formed prior to the season by eight former members of the Western Athletic Conference.
Arkansas State joined the Big West Conference as its seventh member after three seasons as an independent.
Two schools made the move up to Division I-A football this season: the University at Buffalo and Middle Tennessee State University.

Conference changes

Program changes
Two programs, each playing as independents, changed their names prior to the season:
After Northeast Louisiana University changed its name to the University of Louisiana at Monroe, the Northeast Louisiana Indians became the Louisiana–Monroe Indians.
Similarly, after the University of Southwestern Louisiana changed its name to the University of Louisiana at Lafayette, the Southwestern Louisiana Ragin' Cajuns became the Louisiana–Lafayette Ragin' Cajuns.

Regular season top 10 matchups
Rankings reflect the AP Poll. Rankings for Week 9 and beyond will list BCS Rankings first and AP Poll second. Teams that failed to be a top 10 team for one poll or the other will be noted.
Week 0
No. 3 Penn State defeated No. 4 Arizona, 41–7 (Beaver Stadium, University Park, Pennsylvania)
Week 2
No. 1 Florida State defeated No. 10 Georgia Tech, 41–35 (Doak Campbell Stadium, Tallahassee, Florida)
Week 3
No. 3 Penn State defeated No. 8 Miami, 27–23 (Miami Orange Bowl, Miami, Florida)
No. 4 Florida defeated No. 2 Tennessee, 23–21 (Ben Hill Griffin Stadium, Gainesville, Florida)
Week 6
No. 6 Tennessee defeated No. 10 Georgia, 37–20 (Neyland Stadium, Knoxville, Tennessee)
Week 8
No. 5 Tennessee defeated No. 10 Alabama, 21–7 (Bryant-Denny Stadium, Tuscaloosa, Alabama)
Week 9
No. 6/5 Florida defeated No. NR/10 Georgia, 30–14 (Alltel Stadium, Jacksonville, Florida)
Week 11
No. 6/7 Nebraska defeated No. 5/5 Kansas State, 41–15 (Memorial Stadium, Lincoln, Nebraska)
No. 9/11 Alabama defeated No. 10/8 Mississippi State, 19–7 (Bryant-Denny Stadium, Tuscaloosa, Alabama)
Week 12
No. 1/1 Florida State defeated No. 4/3 Florida, 30–23 (Ben Hill Griffin Stadium, Gainesville, Florida)
Week 14
No. 7/7 Alabama defeated No. 4/5 Florida, 34–7 (1999 SEC Championship Game, Georgia Dome, Atlanta, Georgia)

Conference standings

Bowl games

Rankings from final regular season AP poll

BCS bowls
Sugar Bowl: No. 1 Florida State (BCS No. 1, ACC Champ) 46, No. 2 Virginia Tech (BCS No. 2, Big East Champ) 29
Orange Bowl: No. 8 Michigan (At Large) 35, No. 5 Alabama (SEC Champ) 34 (OT)
Rose Bowl: No. 4 Wisconsin (Big 10 Champ) 17, No. 22 Stanford (Pac-10 Champ) 9
Fiesta Bowl: No. 3 Nebraska (Big 12 Champ) 31, No. 6 Tennessee (At Large) 21

Other New Years Day bowls
Cotton Bowl Classic: No. 24 Arkansas 27, No. 12 Texas (Big 12 Runner Up) 6
Florida Citrus Bowl: No. 9 Michigan State 37, No. 10 Florida (SEC Runner Up) 34
Outback Bowl: No. 21 Georgia 28, No. 19 Purdue 25 (OT)
: No. 23 Miami 28, No. 17 Georgia Tech 13

December bowl games
Peach Bowl: No. 16 Mississippi State 17, Clemson 7
: Illinois 63, Virginia 21
Sun Bowl: Oregon 24, No. 13 Minnesota 20
Alamo Bowl: No. 14 Penn State* 24, No. 18 Texas A&M 0
Insight.com Bowl: Colorado 62, No. 25 Boston College 28
Holiday Bowl: No. 7 Kansas State 24, Washington 20
: No. 15 Southern Mississippi (C-USA Champ) 23, Colorado State 17
Aloha Bowl: Wake Forest 23, Arizona State 3
Oahu Bowl: Hawaii-Manoa (WAC Champ) 23, Oregon State 17
Independence Bowl: Mississippi 27, Oklahoma 25
Music City Bowl: Syracuse 20, Kentucky 13
Las Vegas Bowl: Utah 17, Fresno State 16
: No. 11 Marshall (MAC Champ) 21, BYU (MWC Champ) 3
Humanitarian Bowl: Boise State (Big West Champ) 34, Louisville 31
Mobile Alabama Bowl: TCU 28, No. 20 East Carolina 14

Final polls

Heisman Trophy voting
The Heisman Memorial Trophy Award is given to the Most Outstanding Player of the year
Winner:
Ron Dayne, Wisconsin, Running Back (2,042 points)
2. Joe Hamilton, Ga. Tech (994 points)
3. Michael Vick, Va. Tech (319 points)
4. Drew Brees, Purdue (308 points)
5. Chad Pennington, Marshall (247 points)

Other major awards
Maxwell Award (College Player of the Year) – Ron Dayne, Wisconsin
Walter Camp Award (Back) – Ron Dayne, Wisconsin
Davey O'Brien Award (Quarterback) – Joe Hamilton, Georgia Tech
Johnny Unitas Golden Arm Award (Senior Quarterback) – Chris Redman, Louisville
Doak Walker Award (Running Back) – Ron Dayne, Wisconsin
Fred Biletnikoff Award (Wide Receiver) – Troy Walters, Stanford
Bronko Nagurski Trophy (Defensive Player) – Corey Moore, Virginia Tech, DE
Chuck Bednarik Award – LaVar Arrington, Penn State
Dick Butkus Award (Linebacker) – LaVar Arrington, Penn State
Lombardi Award (Lineman or Linebacker) – Corey Moore, Virginia Tech, DE
Outland Trophy (Interior Lineman) – Chris Samuels, Alabama, OT
Jim Thorpe Award (Defensive Back) – Tyrone Carter, Minnesota
Lou Groza Award (Placekicker) – Sebastian Janikowski, Florida St.
Paul "Bear" Bryant Award – Frank Beamer, Virginia Tech
Football Writers Association of America Coach of the Year Award – Frank Beamer, Virginia Tech

References